The 2005 Winter Universiade, the XXII Winter Universiade, took place in Innsbruck and Seefeld, Austria.

Venues

Innsbruck

Seefeld

Medal table

 
2005
U
U
U
Sports competitions in Innsbruck
Winter multi-sport events in Austria
January 2005 sports events in Europe
2000s in Innsbruck